Events from the year 1718 in Scotland.

Incumbents 

 Secretary of State for Scotland: The Duke of Roxburghe

Law officers 
 Lord Advocate – Sir David Dalrymple, 1st Baronet
 Solicitor General for Scotland – Robert Dundas

Judiciary 
 Lord President of the Court of Session – Lord North Berwick
 Lord Justice General – Lord Ilay
 Lord Justice Clerk – Lord Grange

Events 
 Damask linen industry established at Dunfermline by James Blake and at Drumsheugh.
 Marrow Controversy, an ecclesiastical dispute.
 Old Calton Burial Ground established on Calton Hill, Edinburgh, by the Society of the Incorporated Trades of Calton.
 Edinburgh Evening Courant newspaper launched.
 First passage to America of a ship built on the Clyde, and belonging to Glasgow.
 Regius Chair of Anatomy and Botany at the University of Glasgow established.

Births 
 18 February – Robert Henry, historian (died 1790)
 7 April – Hugh Blair, Presbyterian preacher and man of letters (died 1800)
 29 April – Robert Sandeman, theologian (died 1771 in Danbury, Connecticut)
 23 May – William Hunter, anatomist and obstetrician (died 1783 in London)

Deaths 
 1 May – Sir Gilbert Elliot, 1st Baronet, of Minto, judge, politician and writer (born c. 1650)

See also 

 Timeline of Scottish history

References 

 
Years of the 18th century in Scotland
Scotland
1710s in Scotland